"Desiderata" is an early 1920s poem by Max Ehrmann.

Desiderata or Desideratum may also refer to:

Books
 The Desideratum; or, Electricity Made Plain and Useful, a book by John Wesley
 Desiderata Hollow, a fictional character in Witches Abroad by Terry Pratchett
 Desiderata Street, a fictional road within Freeside, a space station in "Neuromancer" by William Gibson

Music
 Desideratum, a cornet model made by Besson

Classical compositions
 "Desiderata nobis", motet by Giacomo Carissimi
 Symphony No. 4, 'Desiderata' by Jaroslav Krček
 Symphony No. 6, Op. 70 'Desiderata' by Carlos Veerhoff

Albums
 Desiderata (Les Crane album), a 1971 spoken word album with music composed by Fred Werner
 Desiderata (Madder Mortem album), a 2006 progressive metal album
 Desideratum (Synæsthesia album), a 1995 ambient album by Synæsthesia
 Desideratum (Anaal Nathrakh album), a 2014 extreme metal album

Songs
 "Desiderata" (Les Crane song), a 1971 reading of the poem and title track of the Grammy winning album 
 "Desiderata", a song on the 2004 Lazyboy album Lazyboy TV
 "Desiderata", a song on the 2006 The Human Abstract album Nocturne

Other uses
 Desiderata, plural of a desideratum, the objects of desire
 Desiderata of the Lombards (fl. 770–771), wife of Charlemagne
 Kerckhoffs's desiderata
 344 Desiderata, a main belt asteroid
 Desideratum, a horse which won the Prix du Lys in 2006
 Desiderata Valley, a fictional neighborhood in The Sims 2: FreeTime

See also
 Desirable (disambiguation)